Rope of Sand may refer to:

Rope of Sand, a 1949 film starring Burt Lancaster
"Escape to Beer Mountain: A Rope of Sand", the first episode of the 2002 animated series Clone High